Wapan (Jukun Wapan) or Kororofa, also known as Wukari after the local town of Wukari, is a major Jukunoid language of Nigeria.

Varieties
Blench (2019) lists the following varieties as part of the Kororofa (Jukun Wapan) cluster:
Abinsi
Wapan proper
Hõne
Dampar (spoken at Dampar, Wukari LGA)

Phonology
Wapan and other Jukunoid languages are interesting in the development of asymmetrical patterns of nasal and oral consonants in West Africa.

One could posit that voiced oral stops become nasal before nasal vowels, sometimes at the expense of having more nasal than oral vowels, which is typologically odd, or that nasal stops denasalise before oral vowels, which is typologically odd as well.

Oral vowels are allowed only in syllables like ba, mba, nasal vowels in bã, mã.

Historically, however, the consonants nasalized: *mb became **mm before nasal vowels and then reduced to *m, leaving the current asymmetric distribution.

References

Jukunoid languages
Languages of Nigeria